The 1968 International cricket season was from May 1968 to August 1968.

Season overview

June

Australia in England

July

MCC in Netherlands

August

World XI in England

References

1968 in cricket